Ibrahim El-Masry   (born 19 August 1971) popularly nicknamed Maradona of Port Said, is a former Egyptian football player and sports manager.

Career
El-Masry played for Al-Masry Club in the Egyptian Premier League. He was the most prominent player in the team during the nineties.

Clubs
Al-Masry Club (1988-03)
Al-Nasr (Salalah) (2003–04)

National teams
Played for Egyptian National Team (1992–1996)
Played in 1991 FIFA World Youth Championship in Portugal
Played in 1992 Summer Olympics in Barcelona

Titles
Personal
Best player in 1991 African Youth Championship.

For National Teams
1 title of African Youth Championship 1991
1 title of Arab Cup of Nations 1992

For Al-Masry
1 title of Egyptian Federation Cup 1992
1 title of Egypt Cup 1998

For Al-Nasr (Salalah)
1 title of Oman Professional League 2004

References

External links 
 
 

1971 births
Living people
Al Masry SC players
Egyptian footballers
Olympic footballers of Egypt
Footballers at the 1992 Summer Olympics
Egypt international footballers
1994 African Cup of Nations players
1996 African Cup of Nations players
Sportspeople from Port Said
Association football midfielders